Qoşaoba (also, Koshaoba) is a village and municipality in the Zardab Rayon of Azerbaijan.  It has a population of 2,492.

References 

Populated places in Zardab District